Sabah–Sarawak Gas Pipeline (SSGP) is a 500 kilometre Malaysian natural gas pipeline that linked Kimanis in Sabah to Bintulu in Sarawak. The pipeline is part of the Petronas development project of "Sabah–Sarawak Integrated Oil and Gas Project", and has start operating since early 2014.

History 
The pipeline was constructed in 2011 with a total of RM4.6 billion been allocated to complete the project.

Incidents 
There have been four reported gas leaks along the line, two resulting explosions. On 11 June 2014, the pipeline located in between Lawas and Long Sukang in Sarawak exploded that caused the temporary shutdown of the line. No casualties were reported in the incident. On 10 January 2018, the line along Long Luping of Lawas District in Limbang Division was leaked although no impact to surrounding communities and environment are being reported. In the early morning of 13 January 2020, there was another explosion which resulted in a fire in the vicinity of the Penan village of Long Selulong, Ulu Baram, Sarawak. On 21 September 2022, a pipeline leak in the vicinity of KP201 due to soil movement which resulted to a safety shutdown on the gas supply. On 17 November 2022, a pipeline located in Long Ugui, Lawas exploded. 1 casualty and 2 injured were reported in the incident.

See also 
 List of natural gas pipelines

References

External links 
 Sabah–Sarawak Gas Pipeline

Buildings and structures in Sabah
Buildings and structures in Sarawak
Natural gas pipelines in Malaysia